Capital punishment is a legal penalty in Algeria. Despite its legality, its last executions were performed in 1993, of seven unnamed Islamic terrorists. Due to its prolonged moratorium on executions, Algeria is considered to be "Abolitionist in Practice."

Algeria's execution methods are the firing squad and shooting. The death penalty is a legal punishment for a variety of offenses including treason; espionage; aggravated murder; castration resulting in death; arson (or destruction using explosive devices) of buildings, vehicles or harvests resulting in death; intentional destruction of military equipment resulting in death; attempts to change the regime or actions aimed at incitement; destruction of territory; sabotage to public and economic utilities; massacres and slaughters; participation in armed bands or in insurrectionary movements; counterfeiting; terrorism; acts of torture or cruelty; kidnapping; aggravated theft; some military offences; poisoning; attempting a death-eligible offense; and some cases of recidivism and perjury leading to a death sentence pronounced.

Algeria voted in favor of all eight UN moratorium on the death penalty resolutions, in 2007, 2008, 2010, 2012, 2014, 2016, 2018, and 2020. It has also been a co-sponsor since at least the 2012 resolution.

References

Algeria
Law of Algeria